The 1908 West Virginia gubernatorial election took place on November 3, concurrently with the Presidential election. Republican nominee William E. Glasscock was elected Governor of West Virginia, defeating Democratic nominee Louis Bennett Sr.

Democratic nomination

Candidates
 Louis Bennett Sr. of Lewis County, former Speaker of the West Virginia House of Delegates.
 Adam Brown Littlepage of Kanawha County, state senator and counsel for the United Mine Workers.

Convention
Louis Bennett Sr. was nominated on the first ballot on July 30. His competitor, Adam B. Littlepage, was nominated for the position of Secretary of State.

By a wide margin, the convention adopted two planks calling for the continuation of disenfranchisement of black voters and segregation of train cars. The adoption of the planks was opposed by former Governor William A. MacCorkle, who warned that they would cause the party's defeat in the general election.

Republican nomination

Candidates
 William Hearne of Ohio County, attorney
 Arnold C. Scherr of Grant County, State Auditor
 Charles W. Swisher of Marion County, Secretary of State

Campaign and conventions
The Republican Party of West Virginia's nomination process in this period was a patchwork of indirect primaries and conventions, all taking place over several months.

Early in the race, Hearne touted that he would go to the convention with the full support of the Northern Panhandle. He was awarded the full slate of delegates from his home state of Ohio County, owing to no other candidates contesting the race. However, after losing the Marshall County primary to Scherr, Hearne dropped out. After the Ohio County Republican Party's executive committee selected a slate of delegates supportive of Scherr, Hearne re-entered the race, demanding to select his own delegates. On July 7, the state party's executive committee ruled in favor of Hearne, leading Scherr's supporters to bolt the convention.

Scherr's supporters, going by the title "Lincoln Republicans", adopted a platform demanding primary elections and nominated a separate set of candidates for statewide office. Within a week, four of the statewide nominees had left the Lincoln Republican ticket - Thomas C. Miller and John T. Harris repudiating the convention that they had attended, James K. Hall and John T. Harris having been nominated by friends without their knowledge.

Compromise
Scherr, Swisher, and presidential nominee William Howard Taft, among other party leaders, held a conference in Hot Springs, Virginia for several days in August. Taft refused to side with either faction.

On September 23, the regular Republicans and Lincoln Republicans agreed to both support William E. Glasscock, as a compromise. Additionally, changes to the nomination process was made, with delegates apportioned based on the county rather than the district, and requiring either a primary or a district convention to be held.

General election

Results

Notes

References

1908
gubernatorial
West Virginia
November 1908 events